The Venezuela women's national handball team is the national team of Venezuela. It is governed by the Federacion Venezolana de Balonmano and takes part in international handball competitions.

Results

Pan American Championship

Caribbean Handball Cup

Bolivarian Games

External links
IHF profile

Women's national handball teams
Handball
National team